Eosin methylene blue (EMB, also known as "Levine's formulation") is a selective stain for Gram-negative bacteria. EMB contains dyes that are toxic to Gram-positive bacteria. EMB is the selective and differential medium for coliforms. It is a blend of two stains, eosin and methylene blue in the ratio of 6:1.  EMB is a differential microbiological medium, which slightly inhibits the growth of Gram-positive bacteria and provides a color indicator distinguishing between organisms that ferment lactose (e.g., E. coli) and those that do not (e.g., Salmonella, Shigella). Organisms that ferment lactose display "nucleated colonies"—colonies with dark centers.

This medium is important in medical laboratories by distinguishing pathogenic microbes in a short period of time.

Rapid lactose fermentation produces acids, which lower the pH. This encourages dye absorption by the colonies, which are now colored purple-black.
Lactose non-fermenters may increase the pH by deamination of proteins. This ensures that the dye is not absorbed. The colonies will be colorless. 
On EMB if E. coli is grown it will give a distinctive metallic green sheen (due to the metachromatic properties of the dyes, E. coli movement using flagella, and strong acid end-products of fermentation).  Some species of Citrobacter and Enterobacter will also react this way to EMB.
This medium has been specifically designed to discourage the growth of Gram-positive bacteria.

EMB contains the following ingredients: peptone, lactose, dipotassium phosphate, eosin Y (dye), methylene blue (dye), and agar.

There are also EMB agars that do not contain lactose.

References

External links
Uses of EMB Agar
History of EMB Agar
Acumedia - EMB Agar
The Scientist - EMB Explanation
Microbugz - EMB Agar

Biochemistry detection reactions
Microbiological media ingredients
Staining
Microbiological media